The 2023 Seville City Council election, also the 2023 Seville municipal election, will be held on Sunday, 28 May 2023, to elect the 12th City Council of the municipality of Seville. All 31 seats in the City Council will be up for election. The election will be held simultaneously with regional elections in at least eight autonomous communities and local elections all throughout Spain.

Electoral system
The City Council of Seville is the top-tier administrative and governing body of the municipality of Seville, composed of the mayor, the government council and the elected plenary assembly. Elections to the local councils in Spain are fixed for the fourth Sunday of May every four years.

Voting for the local assembly is on the basis of universal suffrage, which comprises all nationals over 18 years of age, registered and residing in the municipality of Seville and in full enjoyment of their political rights, as well as resident non-national European citizens and those whose country of origin allows Spanish nationals to vote in their own elections by virtue of a treaty. Local councillors are elected using the D'Hondt method and a closed list proportional representation, with an electoral threshold of five percent of valid votes—which includes blank ballots—being applied in each local council. Councillors are allocated to municipal councils based on the following scale:

The mayor is indirectly elected by the plenary assembly. A legal clause requires that mayoral candidates earn the vote of an absolute majority of councillors, or else the candidate of the most-voted party in the assembly shall be automatically appointed to the post. In the event of a tie, the appointee will be determined by lot.

Parties and candidates
The electoral law allows for parties and federations registered in the interior ministry, coalitions and groupings of electors to present lists of candidates. Parties and federations intending to form a coalition ahead of an election are required to inform the relevant Electoral Commission within ten days of the election call, whereas groupings of electors need to secure the signature of a determined amount of the electors registered in the municipality for which they seek election, disallowing electors from signing for more than one list of candidates. For the case of Seville, as its population is between 300,001 and 1,000,000, at least 5,000 signatures are required.

Below is a list of the main parties and electoral alliances which will likely contest the election:

Opinion polls
The table below lists voting intention estimates in reverse chronological order, showing the most recent first and using the dates when the survey fieldwork was done, as opposed to the date of publication. Where the fieldwork dates are unknown, the date of publication is given instead. The highest percentage figure in each polling survey is displayed with its background shaded in the leading party's colour. If a tie ensues, this is applied to the figures with the highest percentages. The "Lead" column on the right shows the percentage-point difference between the parties with the highest percentages in a poll. When available, seat projections determined by the polling organisations are displayed below (or in place of) the percentages in a smaller font; 16 seats are required for an absolute majority in the City Council of Seville.

Results

Notes

References
Opinion poll sources

Other

Seville
Elections in Seville
May 2023 events in Spain